Conrad Lotz (born 9 April 1981) is a South African cricketer. He played in one first-class match for Boland in 2007.

See also
 List of Boland representative cricketers

References

External links
 

1981 births
Living people
South African cricketers
Boland cricketers
Place of birth missing (living people)